Rizin Fighting Federation (stylised as RIZIN FIGHTING FEDERATION and also known as Rizin FF) is a Japanese mixed martial arts organization created in 2015 by the former Pride Fighting Championships and Dream Stage Entertainment president Nobuyuki Sakakibara.

Founded to be the spiritual successor of Pride FC and Dream, Rizin carries much of the philosophy and ambition of its two predecessors: its events are promoted as larger-than-life events with elaborate opening ceremonies and fighter entrances, its matches are fought in a roped ring and it has a ruleset inherited from Pride and Dream. The organization also promotes "Grand Prix", single-elimination tournaments where fighters have to fight multiple opponents in the same night. Rizin is considered Japan's top MMA promotion.

Rizin has also promoted kickboxing matches, with two "Grand Prix" tournaments in 2017 and 2021.

The promotion's name is a combination of "Raijin", the Japanese god of lightning; the word "rising", meaning "to prosper and thrive"; and the letter, 'Z', meaning "ultimate".

History 
In 1997, Pride Fighting Championships was founded in Japan, promoted by Dream Stage Entertainment. The organization quickly rose up to become the world's most popular MMA promotion and helped to popularize the sport in Japan and in the world. Its events were broadcast to millions through free-to-air and pay-per-view television, and it filled sport stadiums with hundreds of thousands of spectators. Pride differentiated itself from the UFC with its focus on spectacle and entertainment, as well a more permissive ruleset. By 2007, however, Pride closed its doors due a scandal showing its ties to the yakuza causing a financial crisis in the company. Dream Stage Entertainment was bought by Zuffa—UFC's holding company—which initially promised to keep the event running, but eventually cancelled the plans, laid off most of the staff and just absorbed Pride's best fighters. As a response, most of DSE's former staff, fighters and executives joined Fighting and Entertainment Group, the promoters of K-1, to organize a successor, which became known as Dream. However, FEG eventually had its own financial issues and went bankrupt in 2012, as a result. Dream was defunct.

Three years after Dream folded, rumors began circulating that Pride and Dream founder Nobuyuki Sakakibara would return to the industry after an interview with Bellator MMA President Scott Coker was released.

On September 19, 2015, during Bellator MMA & Glory: Dynamite 1, it was announced that Sakakibara had signed former Pride Heavyweight Champion Fedor Emelianenko to headline a New Year's Eve Show in Tokyo for his new MMA promotion. Sakakibara held a press conference on October 8, 2015, with Nobuhiko Takada and other former Pride FC employees to formally announce the launch of "Rizin Fighting Federation". Initial signees included Kazushi Sakuraba, Shinya Aoki, as well as female competitors Gabi Garcia and Rena Kubota.

A Grand Prix tournament was announced (held at 100 kg or roughly 220 lbs), with champions and competitors from Bellator, KSW, Jungle Fight, BAMMA, and King of Kings. Most notably, King Mo was announced to represent Bellator in the tournament. The 8-man bracket was officially finalized on November 30, 2015, with other bouts also being announced shortly thereafter. Kron Gracie (whose father Rickson competed at the inaugural PRIDE event) was announced to participate against Asen Yamamoto. Amongst the veterans in the Japanese scene, Tsuyoshi Kosaka would face James Thompson, and Akebono Tarō would face Bob Sapp.

Initial plans were to do at least four events per year, as opposed to the more frequent scheduling of other promotions, in order to build up the excitement and anticipation. Rizin's presentation is modeled after major sporting events, such as the UEFA Champions League and FIFA World Cup.

In 2018, it was announced that the main event for the traditional New Year's Eve card (Rizin 14) was going to be a boxing match between Floyd Mayweather Jr. and undefeated Japanese kickboxer Tenshin Nasukawa. The match ended up with Nasukawa knocked out two minutes into the first round.

On November 11, 2021, Rizin broke the tradition of Pride and Dream by for the first time holding an event in a cage instead of the traditional roped ring at the Rizin Trigger 1st event.

At New Year's Eve 2022 saw Bellator MMA vs. Rizin FF, an event hosted by Rizin which crossovered with Bellator MMA as part of Rizin 40 and the traditional New Year's Eve mega event. The card saw fighters from each promotion fight each other. The card saw Bellator MMA fighters Gadzhi Rabadanov, former champions A.J. McKee, Juan Archuleta and Kyoji Horiguchi, and current champion Patricio Freire, fighting against Rizin representatives Koji Takeda, Soo Chul Kim, Hiromasa Ougikubo and champions Kleber Koike Erbst and Roberto de Souza. The result was a victory by all Bellator fighters. In the middle of the event, former boxing world champion Manny Pacquiao made a public announcement that he had signed with Rizin for a boxing exhibition match against an yet-unannounced opponent.

Broadcasting and coverage
Rizin's inaugural event was broadcast in North America on Spike TV. Other broadcasters have included SKY Perfect JSAT Corporation, Fuji Television, Fox Sports Brazil, Kix and Match TV. From 2017 to 2019, Rizin events have been streaming on FITE TV in North America and Europe. As of Rizin 26, they have been streaming on LIVENow. Starting with Rizin 38, Rizin returned to FITE TV.

Weight classes

Rules

Mixed martial arts
The rules in Rizin FF have been adopted from Pride FC with some slight modifications over the years. Matches are three rounds in length. Prior to May 2018, the first round of men's matches spanned 10 minutes, while the final two rounds lasted five minutes each. Since then matches have been three rounds of five minutes each. Victory can be attained by knockout, submission, technical knockout by referee stoppage, or by judges' decision.

All strikes, throws and chokes are permitted, with the exception of headbutts and strikes to the back of the head, medulla oblongata, spinal cord or genitals. Soccer kicks, knees and stomps to grounded opponents are also permitted. Unlike Pride, Rizin allows the use of elbow strikes, including the 12–6 elbow.

Judging criteria
Fights are judged on the following criteria:
 Damage: when assessing damage, both striking and grappling are given the same weight. The judges will place value on the extent to which the effective striking or grappling 'influences the match' - in other words, whether there was such damage/advantage to the fighter which would have led to the fight being ended by the opponent tapping out or being knocked out. 
 Aggressiveness: the judges will consider which fighter was more effective in delivering attacks which may end the fight in a finish. Note this element does not take into consideration the actual impact of damage caused by the fighter's strikes, throws or submission. Rather, the judges will place value on whether fighters were aggressive and proactive in their approach during the fight.
 Generalship: the judges will consider which fighter was more effective in dominating the pace, place and position of the fight. Judges will also consider the amount of time spent in a ground position or the standing position.

Although not outlined in the Rizin rules, scorecards published on the JMOC website suggest that damage, aggressiveness and generalship are scored 50, 30 and 20 points respectively. Where the fighter has not fulfilled the element, they are given a score of zero - there are no in-betweens.

Kickboxing
Rizin kickboxing matches are three rounds of three minutes each. Victory can be attained by knockout, technical knockout by referee stoppage, or by judges' decision. If the match goes the distance, a 10-point system is used to judge. Three knockdowns in a single round will result in a technical knockout. All forms of elbow strikes are illegal.

List of Rizin FF events

Current champions

Championship history

Light Heavyweight Championship

Weight limit:

Lightweight Championship

Weight limit:

Featherweight Championship

Weight limit:

Bantamweight Championship

Weight limit:

Women's Super Atomweight Championship

Weight limit:

Grand-Prix Champions

MMA

Kickboxing

Records

Most wins in title bouts

Most consecutive title defenses

Champions by nationality
The division champions include only linear and true champions. Interim champions who have never become linear champions will be listed as interim champions. Fighters with multiple title reigns in a specific division will also be counted once. Runners-up are not included in tournaments champions.

Notable fighters

 Floyd Mayweather Jr.
 Goran Reljić
 Mirko Filipović
 Jarred Brooks
 Bob Sapp
 Muhammed Lawal
 Tenshin Nasukawa
 Kyoji Horiguchi
 Kai Asakura
 Victor Henry
 Shintaro Ishiwatari
 Naoki Inoue
 Hiromasa Ougikubo
 Takafumi Otsuka 
 Ulka Sasaki
 Shoji
 Justin Scoggins
 Ben Nguyen
 Diego Brandao
 Gabi Garcia
 Jairzinho Rozenstruik
 Daron Cruickshank
 Ren Hiramoto 
 Amir Aliakbari
 Fedor Emelianenko
 Vadim Nemkov
 Jiří Procházka
 Tatsuya Kawajiri
 Satoru Kitaoka
 Takasuke Kume
 Daron Cruickshank
 Takanori Gomi 
 Yusuke Yachi
 Let's Gota
 K-Taro Nakamura
 C.B. Dollaway
 Sudario Tsuyoshi

Affiliated organizations
Rizin FF is affiliated with the following organizations:

  Bellator MMA
  Invicta FC
  Fight Nights Global
  Russian MMA Union
  Jungle Fight
  Deep
  Shooto
  VTJ
  K-1
  Shoot boxing
  Road FC
  KSW
  Lithuania Bushido Federation
  Gladiator Championship Fighting
  Full Metal Dojo

See also

 List of current mixed martial arts champions
 List of Bellator champions

References

External links 
 
 

 
Mixed martial arts in Japan
2015 establishments in Japan
Mixed martial arts organizations
Sports organizations established in 2015
Sports organizations of Japan